Sara Soskolne (born 1970) is a Canadian type designer best known for her work at Hoefler & Frere-Jones (H&FJ) type foundry on typefaces such as Gotham. After ten years working in graphic design in Toronto, Soskolne attended the University of Reading where she received her MA in 2003. She has taught type design at Yale School of Art, the Book Arts Institute at Wells College, and New York’s School of Visual Arts and the Cooper Type Certificate Program. Soskolne has written about the evolution of sans-serif lower case types in the 19th century.

Typefaces
Verlag (with H&FJ) 1996
Gotham (with H&FJ) 2001
Chronicle (with H&FJ) 2002
Sentinel (with H&FJ) 2002
Tungsten (with H&FJ)

References

External links
Hoefler & Frere-Jones
Cooper Type Program

1970 births
Living people
Alumni of the University of Reading
Canadian typographers and type designers
School of Visual Arts faculty
Wells College faculty
Yale School of Art faculty